West New Goshen is an unincorporated community in Fayette Township, Vigo County, in the U.S. state of Indiana.

The community is part of the Terre Haute Metropolitan Statistical Area.

Geography

References

Unincorporated communities in Vigo County, Indiana
Unincorporated communities in Indiana
Terre Haute metropolitan area